The 1938 Chicago Cubs season was the 67th season of the Chicago Cubs franchise, the 63rd in the National League and the 23rd at Wrigley Field. The Cubs finished first in the National League with a record of 89–63. The team was swept four games to none by the New York Yankees in the 1938 World Series.

The team is known for the season of pitcher Dizzy Dean. While pitching for the NL in the 1937 All-Star Game, Dean suffered a big toe fracture. Coming back too soon from the injury, Dean changed his pitching motion to avoid landing too hard on his sore toe enough to affect his mechanics. As a result, he hurt his arm, losing his great fastball. By , Dean's arm was largely gone. Cubs scout Clarence "Pants" Rowland was tasked with the unenviable job of obeying owner Philip K. Wrigley's direct order to buy a washed-up Dean's contract at any cost. Rowland signed the ragged righty for $185,000, one of the most expensive loss-leader contracts in baseball history. Dean still helped the Cubs win the 1938 pennant.

On July 20, Wrigley named 37-year-old Gabby Hartnett as the team's player-manager, replacing Charlie Grimm. When Hartnett took over, the Cubs were in third place, six games behind the first place Pittsburgh Pirates who were led by Pie Traynor. By September 27, with one week left in the season, the Cubs had battled back to within a game and a half game of the Pirates in the National League standings as the two teams met for a crucial three-game series. Dean pitched the opening game of the series and with his ailing arm, relied more on his experience and grit to defeat the Pirates by a score of 2 to 1. Dean would later call it the greatest outing of his career. The Cubs cut the Pirates' lead to a half game and set the stage for one of baseball's most memorable moments.

On September 28, the two teams met for the second game of the series, where Hartnett experienced the highlight of his career. With darkness descending on the lightless Wrigley Field and the score tied at 5 runs apiece, the umpires ruled that the ninth inning would be the last to be played. The entire game would have to be replayed the following day if the score remained tied. Hartnett came to bat with two out in the bottom of the ninth inning. With a count of 0 balls and 2 strikes, Hartnett connected on a Mace Brown pitch, launching the ball into the darkness, before it eventually landed in the left-center field bleachers. The stadium erupted into pandemonium as players and fans stormed the field to escort Hartnett around the bases. Hartnett's walk-off home run became immortalized as the Homer in the Gloamin'. The Cubs were now in first place, culminating an impressive 19–3–1 record in September, and the pennant would be clinched three days later.

It would be 50 years before lights were installed at Wrigley Field.

Regular season

Season standings

Record vs. opponents

Roster

Schedule

Player stats

Batting

Starters by position 
Note: Pos = Position; G = Games played; AB = At bats; H = Hits; Avg. = Batting average; HR = Home runs; RBI = Runs batted in

Other batters 
Note: G = Games played; AB = At bats; H = Hits; Avg. = Batting average; HR = Home runs; RBI = Runs batted in

Pitching

Starting pitchers 
Note: G = Games pitched; IP = Innings pitched; W = Wins; L = Losses; ERA = Earned run average; SO = Strikeouts

Other pitchers 
Note: G = Games pitched; IP = Innings pitched; W = Wins; L = Losses; ERA = Earned run average; SO = Strikeouts

Relief pitchers 
Note: G = Games pitched; W = Wins; L = Losses; SV = Saves; ERA = Earned run average; SO = Strikeouts

1938 World Series

Game 1 
October 5, 1938, at Wrigley Field in Chicago

Game 2 
October 6, 1938, at Wrigley Field in Chicago

Game 3 
October 8, 1938, at Yankee Stadium in New York City

Game 4 
October 9, 1938, at Yankee Stadium in New York City

Farm system 

LEAGUE CHAMPIONS: Ponca City, Greeneville

References 

1938 Chicago Cubs season at Baseball Reference

External links 
 1938: A Rockier Road
 A Pennant Made of Cheesecloth, Baseball Digest, October 1954
 When Gabby Hartnett Hit His Homer in the Gloamin, Baseball Digest, October 1978

Chicago Cubs seasons
Chicago Cubs season
National League champion seasons
Chicago Cubs